New Sounds is a radio program on WNYC that features contemporary and world music. Hosted by John Schaefer, the program has been running since 1982.

Laurie Anderson was the show's very first guest. It was possibly the first radio program to play Philip Glass's 1984 opera Akhnaten. The Bang on a Can collective has been featured on the show since its early days.

In 2019, WNYC announced that New Sounds was being cut from the station. After the announcement there was an immediate uproar by both longtime listeners and WNYC staffers. After considering the protests, WNYC management relented and pledged to continue the program.

References

External links
 https://www.newsounds.org/shows/newsounds

2010s American radio programs
WNYC Studios programs
American music radio programs
American public radio programs
New York Public Radio
1982 radio programme debuts